Karl Paul Donfried (April 6, 1940 – February 23, 2022) was an American theologian and New Testament scholar. He is Elizabeth A. Woodson Professor Emeritus of Religion and Biblical Literature at Smith College.

Life
Donfried was born in New York City and graduated from the prep school Trinity School. He went to college at Columbia University (B.A. 1960) and Harvard Divinity School (B.D. 1963 under G. Ernest Wright). Donfried was ordained by the Lutheran Church in America on June 5, 1963, and went on to earn graduate degrees from Union Theological Seminary (S.T.M. 1965 under W. D. Davies) and the University of Heidelberg (Dr. theol. 1968 under Günther Bornkamm).	

His daughter, Karen Donfried, is the former president of the German Marshall Fund and is currently serving as Assistant Secretary of State for European and Eurasian Affairs in the Biden Administration. His son, Mark Donfried is director general at the Berlin-based Institute for Cultural Diplomacy.

Books

References

External links
http://sophia.smith.edu/~kdonfrie/bio.html

1940 births
2022 deaths
20th-century Protestant theologians
Harvard Divinity School alumni
Trinity School (New York City) alumni
Smith College faculty
Columbia College (New York) alumni
Union Theological Seminary (New York City) alumni
Heidelberg University alumni
People from New York City